Formerly known as Kaohsiung Polytechnic Institute (KPI), I-Shou University (ISU) is a private university in Dashu District, Kaohsiung, Taiwan. ISU was established in 1986 by I-Shou Lin, the founder of E United Group (義联集團), to commemorate his mother as well as to benefit the villages and towns where he started his business. KPI was officially renamed I-Shou University on August 1, 1997.

ISU has nine colleges and one center: College of Intelligent Science & Technology, College of Science & Engineering, College of Management, College of Communication & Design, International College, College of Tourism & Hospitality, College of Language Arts, College of Medicine, College of Medical Science  & Technology ,College of Indigenous Studies, and Center for General Education. It has 43 departments offering 16 master's programs, 7 doctoral programs, 4 bachelor's degree programs for indigenous peoples, 1 international programs, 12 evening bachelor's degree programs, 2 two-year in-service bachelor's degree programs, and 9 in-service master's programs.

History
1986: Kaohsiung Polytechnic Institute was founded.
1990: Initial student recruitment.
1997: The institute was renamed as 'I-Shou University'. 
1999: The establishment of the Yanchao Campus was approved.
2006: The Yanchao Campus was inaugurated.
2009: The International College was established, providing students with a total immersion learning environment in English.
2010: Initial student recruitment for the School of Chinese Medical for Post Baccalaureate.
2011: The College of Communication & Design and the College of Tourism & Hospitality were established.
2012: Initial student recruitment for the bachelor's degree Program for Indigenous Peoples in Communication & Design and the bachelor's degree Program for Indigenous Peoples in Tourism & Hospitality
2013: Initial student recruitment for the School of Medicine for International Students and the bachelor's degree Program for Indigenous Peoples in Nursing. The College of Medicine was officially established after 13 years' effort. 
2014: The Yanchao Campus was renamed as the Medical Campus.
2015: Initial student recruitment for the bachelor's degree Program for Indigenous Peoples in Long-term Care.
2016: The College of Indigenous Studies was established.
2017: Initial student recruitment for the Department of Medical Laboratory Science.
2018: Initial student recruitment for the International Program on Intelligent Systems & Automation Engineering and the International Program on Communication Production.
2019: Initial student recruitment for the School of Medicine.
2020: The College of Intelligent Science and Technology was established.
2021: The College of Medical Science and Technology was established.

ISU Presidents

Campuses
The Main Campus is located in the Guanyinshan area and accommodates the College of Intelligent Science & Technology, the College of Management, the College of Science & Engineering, the College of Language Arts, the College of Tourism & Hospitality, the College of Communication & Design, the International College, the College of Indigenous Studies, and the Center for General Education.

The Medical Campus, across from E-DA Hospital in Yanchao District of Kaohsiung City, was opened in 2006 to accommodate the College of Medicine. In 2010 ISU was approved by the Ministry of Education to establish the School of Chinese Medicine for Post Baccalaureate and three years later the School of Medicine for International Students with all courses taught in English in 2013. In 2018, ISU gained approval from the Ministry of Education to establish a six-year, government-funded MD program for Taiwanese citizens, and welcomed its inaugural class in 2019.

References

External links

Official website

1986 establishments in Taiwan
Educational institutions established in 1986
Universities and colleges in Kaohsiung
Universities and colleges in Taiwan
Comprehensive universities in Taiwan